Iglesia de San Salvador (Nocedo) is a church in Asturias, Spain. The church was established in the 1170s.

See also
Asturian art
Catholic Church in Spain
Churches in Asturias
List of oldest church buildings

References

Churches in Asturias
1170s establishments in Europe
12th-century establishments in the Kingdom of León